Julian Cassell (born 24 October 1967) is a former English cricketer. Cassell was a right-handed batsman who bowled right-arm medium pace.

Cassell made his debut for Dorset in the 1990 Minor Counties Championship against Herefordshire. He represented Dorset in 44 Minor Counties Championship matches from 1993 to 1998, with his final Minor Counties match for Dorset coming against Devon.

In 1995, he made his List-A debut for Dorset against Glamorgan in the 1st round of the 1995 NatWest Trophy. Cassell represented Dorset in one further List-A match, against Scotland in the 1st round of the 1999 NatWest Trophy.

External links
Julian Cassell at Cricinfo
Julian Cassell at CricketArchive
 http://www.juliancassell.com

1967 births
Living people
Sportspeople from Salisbury
People from Wiltshire
English cricketers
Dorset cricketers